Greenwayodendron is a small genus of flowering plants in the family Annonaceae.

There are two species in the genus Greenwayodendron:
 Greenwayodendron oliveri
 Greenwayodendron suaveolens

References

Annonaceae
Annonaceae genera
Taxa named by Bernard Verdcourt